Narcissa may refer to:

Narcissa, Oklahoma, a census-designated place (CDP) in Ottawa County, Oklahoma, United States

People with the given name
Narcissa Niblack Thorne (1882–1966), American artist
Narcissa Whitman (1808–1847), American missionary
Narcissa Wright (born 1989), American Internet celebrity and ESports player

Fiction
Narcissa Malfoy, supporting character in the Harry Potter universe

See also

Narcisa (disambiguation)
Narciso, a given name
Narcisse (disambiguation)
Narcissus (disambiguation)
Narcís (disambiguation)

English feminine given names
Given names derived from plants or flowers